San Vito Romano is a comune (municipality) in the Metropolitan City of Rome in the Italian region Lazio, located about  east of Rome.

San Vito Romano borders the following municipalities: Bellegra, Capranica Prenestina, Genazzano, Olevano Romano, Pisoniano.

People
Francesco Rocca - football player

Sport 
Club Hockey Libero San Vito 1967
A.S.D. Sanvitese Calcio (football)
A.S.D Pro Calcio V.I.S Empolitana  (football)

References

External links
 Official website

Cities and towns in Lazio